The Brickell World Plaza, also known as 600 Brickell, and formerly known as the Brickell Financial Center, is an office skyscraper in Miami, Florida, United States in the Downtown neighborhood and financial district of Brickell at 600 Brickell Avenue. The former Brickell Financial Centre Phase I, the Brickell World Plaza, is a  skyscraper, one of the tallest buildings in Miami. 600 Brickell is located between the sixth Street and seventh Street Metromover stations.

The building contains  of leasable floor space, an eleven-story parking garage with 927 spaces, and a  ground level public plaza.

History

The 40-story building topped out in early 2009, but construction was suspended, or greatly slowed, as the building was still not completed over two years later as of March 2011. The building lost an anchor tenant, a law firm with a $58 million, 10.5-year lease for 15 percent of the building (115,000 sq ft), in early 2009. With the new name of Brickell World Plaza, the building had a scheduled opening date of August 2011. The Foram Group, building developers of Brickell World Plaza, have claimed that this slowed construction was strategic for the purpose of detail and that after completion, they would move their corporate offices into the building. However, the near halt in construction and the loss of a major tenant suggests that the delay was not strategic but due to the 2008 economic crisis and the falling demand for office space due to the excessive construction in Miami at the time.

Early in 2011, 600 Brickell got a $130 million construction mortgage loan from Los Angeles-based Canyon Capital Reality Advisors that would fund the rest of the construction. This was one of the largest loans issued in the city of Miami since the real estate crisis.

When 600 Brickell came online in August–September 2011, it increased Miami's downtown office vacancy to nearly 25%, and Class A Brickell vacancy to over 30%.

The Foram Group hired Jones Lang LaSalle, led by veteran brokers Glenn Gregory and Noël Steinfeld, to handle leasing for the nearly  building. Gregory and Steinfeld said a full-court press to land tenants is finally underway. Shortly before Foram hired Jones Lang, the developer signed a pair of new-to-market tenants — New York-based lender Doral Money and Irvine, California-based mediation and arbitration services firm JAMS — to occupy a combined  at the building.

The Miami office of the law firm Gunster is located on the building's 35th floor.

Amenities 

The building was at the time of completion South Florida's first Cisco Connected Commercial Office Building in partnership with Cisco Systems Inc. It was planned to have its own dedicated hub connecting it to the Internet with a secure and flawless connection.
The project was designed by the global architecture firm RTKL and its developer was the Foram Group. The Foram Group's intended goal was to set a new gold-standard for technology and sustainability in international commercial property development by creating the most innovative and forward-thinking office building in Miami.

"We designed the building from the inside out, not the outside in," said Loretta H. Cockrum, Foram's founder, chairman and CEO. "We wanted the most efficient office building ever designed, with no wasted space or wasted energy. This is a building of the future more than a building of the present. A lot of love has gone into that building, and a lot of pride."

The Brickell World Plaza was the state of Florida's first building to be pre-certified under the U.S. Green Building Council's Leadership in Energy and Environmental Design (LEED) program. In addition to this it is one of very few buildings in the world of its size to receive the LEED Platinum rating, the highest available from the US Green Building Council. Another feature that contributed to this precertification is the water program: the building collects all rainfall and condensed water from the cooling towers in a  tank to be reused for irrigation and makeup water for the fountains at Brickell World Plaza.

It is also the first building in South Florida to be a part of Cisco Systems "Cisco Connected Commercial Office Building", which means that it has a fast and secure, dedicated internet connection. The originally planned Brickell Financial Centre (two buildings) was to include office space, a hotel, luxury condominiums and a public plaza. The first eleven floors of the building above the plaza are a parking garage, while the remaining 28 floors are office space. The outside of Brickell World Plaza is lit up at night similar to the Miami Tower. This began before Christmas in December 2011 with a ceremony with governor Rick Scott where a 40-foot wreath was hung on the building.

Brickell Financial Centre II

Brickell Financial Centre Phase II, which was scheduled for completion in 2011, would have been the tallest building in Miami and Florida upon completion, at 903 feet (275 m). It was planned to contain 68 floors. The Brickell Financial Centre complex was always planned to be done in two phases, with the second building being constructed after the first, so the second building may still be built, presumably under a different, new name. The second phase was planned to be a mixed-use building, containing several hundred thousand feet of office space, as well as several hundred thousand feet of condominium and hotel space, and would be a substantially larger building than the Brickell World Plaza. The area where BFC II would stand was turned into a parking lot in late 2011 with the completion of Brickell World Plaza and included a small valet structure.

See also

 List of tallest buildings in Miami
 Downtown Miami

References

External links
Brickell Financial Centre from Emporis
600 Brickell Official site
Brickell World Plaza Official site

Skyscraper office buildings in Miami
Office buildings completed in 2011
2011 establishments in Florida
Leadership in Energy and Environmental Design platinum certified buildings
RTKL Associates buildings